The Manitoba Liberal Party fielded a full slate of 57 candidates in the 2007 provincial election, and won two seats to remain as the third-largest party in the Legislative Assembly of Manitoba.  Some of the party's candidates have their own biography pages; information about others may be found here.

Candidates

Candidates in post-2007 by-elections
Elmwood, 24 March 2009: Regan Wolfrom

Footnotes

2007